Drillia siebenrocki is a species of sea snail, a marine gastropod mollusk in the family Drilliidae.

Description

Distribution
This species occurs in the Red Sea

References

 Tippett D.L. (2006a) Taxonomic notes on some Indo-Pacific and West African Drillia species (Conoidea: Drillidae). Iberus, 24, 13-21

External links
 
 Janssen, Ronald, and Marco Taviani. "Taxonomic, ecological and historical considerations on the deep-water benthic mollusc fauna of the Red Sea." The Red Sea. Springer Berlin Heidelberg, 2015. 511-529.

siebenrocki
Gastropods described in 1900